Eastern Housing Limited (EHL) is a public limited company in Bangladesh working in real estate development. The registered office of the company is situated in Bangladesh. EHL is one of the 29 members of the REHAB Association, the central body for private sector developers in Bangladesh. EHL was established with the objectives of development of land for housing in the urban areas of Dhaka. It is involved in construction, engineering, manufacturing and trading activities. It has been responsible for redefining the environment in Dhaka, the capital of Bangladesh, along with other major developers.

Background
EHL is a concern of Islam Group (A Jahurul Islam companies) ig.com.bd. It was formed in late 1965 under the Chairmanship of Mr. Jahurul Islam (entrepreneur) to reduce the housing problems of Dhaka city. It started its work by successfully implementing a project of building 700 houses in Pallabi Thana, Dhaka, and acquiring  of land. It was one of the first to provide low-cost housing to the residents of Bangladesh (then East Pakistan).

While the company started operations by developing real estate mostly within Dhaka, the capital of the country, it has started to build outside the city. It regularly takes part in REHAB real estate fairs, both at home and abroad, and experiences sell-out performances. The slogan of Eastern Housing Limited is Apan Thikana Gore Dey, which translates to builds your own address.

Engineer Md Akramuzzaman, director of the company, took part in the national dialogue on "Strengthening the Role of Private Sector Housing in Bangladesh" organized by Centre for Policy Dialogue in November 2003. In January 2004, the company became a part of the government initiative to build housing for expatriate Bangladeshis in Gulshan Thana, Dhaka. In 2005, Eastern Housing became the highest tax-payer among the 101 real estate developers listed with National Board of Revenue (NBR).

On October 16, 2006, RAJUK, the Dhaka City development authority, sent notice about "unauthorized" construction to the Ministry of Housing which included projects of Eastern Housing. Dr. Asaduzzaman, vice chairman of Islam Group, ruled out the possibility of any dubious practices. Some of the real estate developed by Eastern Housing have has faced criticism. The Eastern Tower, an 18-storied apartment block in New Eskaton, Dhaka, is criticized for not installing ample emergency escapes, while the South Banasree project is criticized for getting waterlogged during the monsoon.

Market share
It has also successfully completed over 3,500 units of apartment and has built some modern shopping plazas and commercial complexes numbering approximating 1500 units. Overall EHL has got more than 40% market share in residential plot and apartment development business in Bangladesh.

Financial performance
As of January 1, 2008 the total market capitalization of the company is BDT 878 million. Of this 48% is held by sponsor company Islam Group of Industries, 33% by general public, 18% by different financial institutions and 1% by foreign investors. In 1994 the company listed with Dhaka Stock Exchange where it is listed as a Category A (highest ranking) company. Between 2001 and 2007 the company has generated dividend yield of 8%-13% for its investors. The company held its last annual general meeting on December 18, 2006, when it announced BDT 72 million net profit after tax, which translates to BDT 11.54 of earnings per share. A consistently profitable venture, Eastern Housing paid 10% dividend to stockholders in 2003, and a 15% in 2007.

See also
 List of real estate companies of Bangladesh

References

External links
 Eastern Housing Limited official website

Real estate companies of Bangladesh